Albert Hopoate (born 26 June 1985 in North Ryde) is an Australian professional rugby league/union player who is currently contracted to the Penrith Emus in the NSW Shute Shield competition. He is the younger brother of controversial former international player John Hopoate.

Albert attended Eaglevale High School, where he made the Australian Schoolboys Rugby Union Team. He is a member of the Church of Jesus Christ of Latter-day Saints.

He was named in the Tonga training squad for the 2008 Rugby League World Cup. Like his brother John, he is also known by the nickname 'Hoppa'.

References

External links
Sydney Roosters profile
Newtown Jets profile
Young Hopoate is on a mission

1985 births
Living people
Australian Latter Day Saints
Australian rugby league players
Albert
Rugby league centres
Rugby league players from Sydney
Sydney Roosters players
Tonga national rugby league team players